Nujiang may refer to:

Nujiang River, or Salween River, in China and Southeast Asia
Nujiang Lisu Autonomous Prefecture, prefecture in Yunnan, China
Nujiang, Tibet, a village in the Tibet Autonomous Region of China